The 2011 Isle of Man TT Festival was scheduled to be held between Monday 30 May and Friday 10 June 2011 on the 37.73-mile Snaefell Mountain Course in the Isle of Man. The main celebration for the 2011 Isle of Man TT Races the Milestones of the Mountain Course special parade lap held on 10 June 2011 to commemorate the centenary of the Isle of Man TT Mountain Course included the former FIM World Champions Giacomo Agostini and Phil Read. The 2011 Isle of Man TT Festival also included the Pre-TT Classic Races on 27, 28 and 30 May 2011 and the Post-TT Races on 11 June 2011 and both events held on the Billown Circuit.

The Blue Riband event of the 2011 TT Race week the Senior TT was delayed several hours after a heavy rain shower in the Ramsey area of the Mountain Course.  The Senior TT was won by John McGuinness and after also winning the Superbike TT Race raised to 17 wins his tally of Isle of Man TT victories.  The Supersport TT Race 1 was reduced to 3 laps (113.00 miles) and after a tactical battle was won by the New Zealand competitor Bruce Anstey. The Supersport TT Race 2 produced a first win for Gary Johnson and the sidecar crew John Holden/Andrew Winkle also scored a popular maiden win in the second Sidecar TT Race.  After dominating Sidecar TT practice the former Austrian World Sidecar Champion Klaus Klaffenböck scored his third Isle of Man TT win in the Sidecar TT Race 1.  The Superstock TT Race for production motorcycles was won by Michael Dunlop. In the TT Zero race for battery powered electric motor driven motorcycles the American MotoCzysz team won for the second year and the race time for Michael Rutter falling slightly short of the coveted 100 mph average lap speed.

During the second practice session the sidecar crew of Bill Currie/Kevin Morgan crashed fatally at Ballacrye Corner. The former 2007 Junior Manx Grand Prix winner Derek Brien died in an accident at Gorse Lea during lap 1 of the Supersport TT Race 1, and the race was red-flagged after the incident and re-run later in the day.

Results

Practice times

Practice times and leaderboard superbike/Senior TT
Plates; Black on White/Black on Yellow.

Practice times and leaderboard supersport Junior TT

Practice times and leaderboard 600 cc Sidecar TT

Race results

2011 Superbike TT final standings. 
4 June 2011 6 Laps (236.38 Miles) Mountain Course.

Fastest Lap: Bruce Anstey – 131.379 mph (17' 13.88) on lap 1.

2011 Sidecar TT Race 1 TT final standings 
4 June 2011 3 Laps (113.00 Miles) Mountain Course.

Fastest Lap: John Holden/Andrew Winkle – 114.861 mph (19' 42.55) on lap 3.

2011 Supersport Junior TT Race 1 
6 June 2011 3 Laps (113.00 Miles) Mountain Course. Reduced Race Distance

Fastest Lap: Bruce Anstey – 126.595 mph (17' 52.94) on lap 3.

2011 Superstock TT final standings. 
6 June 2011 4 Laps (150.73 Miles) Mountain Course.

Fastest Lap: Michael Dunlop – 129.709 mph (17' 27.17) on lap 4.

2011 Supersport Junior TT Race 2 Mountain Course. 
9 June 2011 4 Laps (150.73 Miles) Mountain Course.

Fastest Lap: Gary Johnson – 125.892 mph (17' 58.92) on lap 2.

2011 Sidecar TT Race 2 TT final standings 
9 June 2011 3 Laps (113.00 Miles) Mountain Course.

Fastest Lap: Klaus Klaffenböck/Dan Sayle – 114.672 mph (19' 44.50) on lap 2.

2011 TT Zero Race 
9 June 2011 1 Lap (37.73 Miles) Mountain Course.

Fastest Lap: Michael Rutter – 99.604 mph (22' 43.68) on lap 1.

2011 Senior TT final standings. 
10 June 2011 6 Laps (236.38 Miles) Mountain Course.

Fastest Lap: John McGuinness – 131.248 mph (17' 14.89) on lap 4.

Sources

External links

 2011 Isle of Man TT Races Circuit Guide

Isle of Man TT
Isle of Man TT
2011
2011 in motorcycle sport